The Elliott sisters, Emily (1893-3 March 1983, later Ledwith) and Eilís (26 June 1896 – 29 March 1966, later Ní Briain), were two Irish sisters notable for their involvement in Irish Nationalism, especially in the Easter Rising in 1916. They were founder members of Cumann na mBan.

Biographies 
Emily and Eilís were born in Tonagh near Glasson in Co. Westmeath. They were born to farmer Peter Elliott and Margaret Berry. They had sisters: Ethel, Theresa, Rebecca and Ethel (Sr. Imelda) and brothers: J.J.  (John Joseph), Andrew, Charles, Edward and Arthur. At the time of the rising Eilís was living at Gardiner's Place in Dublin. She is also known as Lizzie.

These two sisters were involved with the nationalist movement in Ireland. The women were members of Cumann na mBan, Emily was a member of the Keating branch. Emily wanted to volunteer in the General Post Office, (GPO) and headed into the city with Eilís Ryan. They were turned away from the GPO and sent to Reis's Chambers on the opposite side of O'Connell Street from the GPO during the Easter Rising. The volunteers were trying to ensure the details of the rising got released and the chambers hosted a wireless school. The women were responsible for ensuring the men had rations, which required them crossing O'Connell street while it was under fire more than once. On the second day the two women were joined by Eilís Elliott.

The women later served in the Four Courts and in Fr Matthew Hall both in providing rations and first aid support. On the final night and with the assistance of the priests, the women mingled with the congregation from the church and avoided being arrested.

Westmeath musician Enda Seery composed a suite of traditional Irish music, A New Ireland in the Orchard Air, to honour the sisters. The council decided to name a new bridge over the River Shannon the Cumman na mBan bridge in honour of the sisters and the organisation.

On 7 April 2018, Westmeath County Council organised the renaming of a road in Athlone "Elliott Road" in honour of two local sisters’ contributions to the Easter Rising. The Mayor of Athlone, Aengus O’Rourke, unveiled the sign for the newly named Elliott Road. Eilis Elliott's grandson, John McCann, made a speech on behalf of the Elliott family. Eilis Elliott's eldest grandson, Kevin Griffin, wore her medals on this historic occasion attended by about a hundred members of the Elliott family.

References

Further reading
 
 
 

Women in war 1900–1945
Women in war in Ireland
People of the Easter Rising
Cumann na mBan members